10/9 may refer to:
October 9 (month-day date notation)
September 10 (day-month date notation)
10 shillings and 9 pence in UK predecimal currency